Tum Bin, also known as Tum Bin... Love Will Find a Way, is a 2001 Indian Hindi-language romantic drama film written and directed by Anubhav Sinha. The film stars Priyanshu Chatterjee, Sandali Sinha, Himanshu Malik and Raqesh Bapat. The music is composed by Nikhil-Vinay, with lyrics penned by Faaiz Anwar. The film is a remake of  Ernst Lubitsch’s 1932 film Broken Lullaby.

Plot 
After Amar Shah's accidental death in India, Canada-based Shah Industries is on the verge of collapse. Pia Varma, Amar's fiancée and a Managing Director of Shah Industries, is devastated, Girdhari, his dad, is in shock and unresponsive towards others while Amar's sister and grandmother are in mourning. 
Inspector D'Mello who is investigating the case is determined to find the person responsible for the accident despite his superiors' indifference towards the case.

Months after Amar's death, a highly respected and talented business worker named Shekhar Malhotra offers to re-build and restore Shah Industries without any compensation, stating Amar met him in India and offered him a job before his death. He is given the chance and goes about the uphill task of making the company viable again. Gradually, Shekhar heals the gaping wound left in the Shah family by Amar's death and they come to accept him as one of the family while he falls in love with Pia. What they don't know – except for Bosco, Shekhar's friend in Canada – is that it was Shekhar's jeep that accidentally had hit Amar after he swerved to avoid hitting an innocent girl who had walked into the road, causing his death. Ridden by guilt Shekhar came to Canada to confess, ask for forgiveness, and do whatever he can for the family.

Abhigyan is a wealthy Canadian industrialist who meets Pia and realizes that she is the right woman for him. He is considering proposing to Pia and helping to rebuild Shah Industries. But Pia has fallen in love with Shekhar. Eventually, a conflict arises between Pia and Shekhar regarding a proposition made by Abhi to take over Shah Industries. Shekhar realizes that Pia does not need his help anymore and decides to return to India.

Pia stops Shekhar while he boards his flight and confesses her feelings for him. Shekhar denies his feelings and boards the plane. Devastated, Pia goes home and gets engaged to Abhi. At the airport arrives Inspector D'Mello, from India in search of the person who killed Amar, and arrests Shekhar. They wait, with Bosco, to board the next flight to India. Shekhar calls Pia and tells her how much he loves her and confesses that it was he who hit her fiancé. Being drunk, Shekhar meets with an accident.

Pia feels guilty about falling for the man who caused Amar's death and confesses it to Girdhari, who surprises her by speaking for the first time after his son's death. He tells her that Shekhar had told him the truth when he first visited them and he believes Shekhar. Amar's family then makes Pia realize how much Shekhar has done for the family and that he is like Amar to them. Bosco informs them about Shekhar's accident. Abhi tells a skeptical Pia to go back to Shekhar as he is her true love. Meanwhile, D'Mello who is in the hospital with everyone, understands that the family needs Shekhar more than the law does and simply closes the case and leave. The movie ends with Shekhar recovering and uniting with Pia while Abhi is left devastated and is comforted by his uncle.

Cast
Priyanshu Chatterjee as Shekhar Malhotra 
Sandali Sinha as Pia Varma
Himanshu Malik as Abhi Gyan
Raqesh Bapat as Amar Shah
Vikram Gokhale as Girdhari Shah
Amrita Prakash as Milli Shah
Dina Pathak as Amar's grandmother
Manoj Pahwa as Inspector D'Mello
Rajesh Khera as Bosco
Rajendra Gupta as Iftekhar "Ifti"
Navneet Nishan as Ayesha "Phuphu" 
Vrajesh Hirjee as Iftekhar's Manager

Production

Filming

The principal photography started from November 2000, and the film is mostly shot in Calgary, Canada, while the songs were picturised in Mumbai.

Jagjit Singh "Koi Fariyad" controversy
During the making of the film, Anubhav Sinha, director, approached Jagjit Singh for the film's background music and song. During record, Sinha rejected Gazal's "Sher" 81 times, disappointing Singh and made him to leave the task, but soon after, he understood the situation and agreed to complete the Gazal.
 
Further, Nikhil (music director) said:

Casting 
At film's initial stage, John Abraham also auditioned for the film but was rejected after a "very bad" tryout.

Critical reception
Pratiksha Arora in a review for Rediff complimented the first half of the movie, but felt the second half of the movie "disappoints".  Several aspects stood out well, including some of the photography during the songs and the overall story, but felt the music was lacking and the film was too long. Taran Adarsh of IndiaFM gave the film 2 stars out of 5, writing: "On the whole, TUM BIN has gloss, a hit musical score, competent performances, mature direction and a tremendous publicity campaign as its assets. But the screenplay in the second half and the loose editing dilute the impact to an extent. Yet, with some trimming, the film should find patronage from those who enjoy emotional films. However, the big oppositions (Aks and the two hits ? Gadar and Lagaan) will restrict its prospects to an extent. Business in Mumbai should be the best."

Box office 

Soundtrack
The soundtrack is composed by Nikhil-Vinay, Ravi Pawar and T.S.Jarnail and released on 2 May 2001, two-months earlier than the actual film. The lyrics were provided by Faaiz Anwar, Yogesh, Pushpa Patel and T.S. Jarnail. Singers like K.S. Chitra, Shailaja Subramanian, Anuradha Paudwal, Udit Narayan, Sonu Nigam, Jagjit Singh, Abhijeet Bhattacharya and Tarsame Singh Saini lent their voices for the soundtrack.  According to the Indian trade website Box Office India, with 2,000,000 units sold, this film's soundtrack album was the year's sixth highest-selling.

Track list

Sequel

A sequel of the film, Tum Bin 2 starring Neha Sharma, Aashim Gulati and Aditya Seal was released in 2016.

Remake
The film was remade in Telugu as Ela Cheppanu (2003) starring Tarun and Shriya Saran.

References

External links
 

2001 films
2000s Hindi-language films
Films directed by Anubhav Sinha
Films scored by Nikhil-Vinay
Films set in Canada
Hindi films remade in other languages
T-Series (company) films
2001 directorial debut films